Okrayushkin is a rural locality (a khutor) in Perevalenskoye Rural Settlement, Podgorensky District, Voronezh Oblast, Russia. The population was 142 as of 2010. There are 5 streets.

Geography 
Okrayushkin is located 15 km north of Podgorensky (the district's administrative centre) by road. Probuzhdeniye is the nearest rural locality.

References 

Rural localities in Podgorensky District